Stade 1er Novembre 1954 is a multi-use stadium in El Oued, Algeria.It is currently used mostly for football matches and athletics stadium is the home ground of NT Souf.  NT Souf is. The stadium holds 7,200 spectators. Number of football tournament has been held in this stadium.

References

1er Novembre 1954
Buildings and structures in El Oued Province